2022 Badminton World Federation World Tour - mixed doubles
2022 World Mixed Doubles Curling Championship
2022 World Mixed Doubles (snooker)